Jordan competed at the 2000 Summer Olympics in Sydney, Australia.

Athletics

Men's 800m
Mohammad Alkafraini
 Round 1 – DQ (→ did not advance, last and 62nd place)

Women's Shot Put
Nada Kawar
 Qualifying – 15.67 (→ did not advance, last and 25th place)

Swimmings

Men's 200m Individual Medley
Omar Abu-Fares
 Preliminary Heat – 2:21.22 (→ did not advance, last and 56th place) 
Women's 200m Butterfly
Hana Majaj
 Preliminary Heat – 2:31.78 (→ did not advance, last and 36th place)

Shooting

Men

References
Wallechinsky, David (2004). The Complete Book of the Summer Olympics (Athens 2004 Edition). Toronto, Canada. . 
International Olympic Committee (2001). The Results. Retrieved 12 November 2005.
Sydney Organising Committee for the Olympic Games (2001). Official Report of the XXVII Olympiad Volume 1: Preparing for the Games. Retrieved 20 November 2005.
Sydney Organising Committee for the Olympic Games (2001). Official Report of the XXVII Olympiad Volume 2: Celebrating the Games. Retrieved 20 November 2005.
Sydney Organising Committee for the Olympic Games (2001). The Results. Retrieved 20 November 2005.
International Olympic Committee Web Site

Nations at the 2000 Summer Olympics
2000
2000 in Jordanian sport